Atelidea is a genus of Asian long-jawed orb-weavers that was first described by Eugène Louis Simon in 1895.  it contains two species, found in Sri Lanka and India: A. nona and A. spinosa.

See also
 List of Tetragnathidae species

References

Araneomorphae genera
Spiders of the Indian subcontinent
Tetragnathidae